"Lucky Number" is a song by English-American recording artist Lene Lovich. Originally released as a B-side for Lovich's cover of "I Think We're Alone Now", the song was re-released in 1979 by Stiff Records as an A-side and became the lead single of her debut studio album Stateless (1978). The song was written by Lovich and Les Chappell, who produced the song.

"Lucky Number" received very positive reviews from music critics and was a commercial success, peaking at number two in Australia, number three in the Netherlands, New Zealand and the United Kingdom, and number five in Belgium. The single also charted well in Ireland and Austria. It became a defining song of the new wave genre.

"Lucky Number" was covered by German punk artist Nina Hagen. The German version "Wir leben immer... noch" ("We are alive… still") was released on the album Unbehagen (1979).

Background and recording
After the break-up of the band the Diversions in December 1976, Lovich started searching for another band. She contacted a radio presenter Charlie Gillett and advertised herself as a sax player looking for a band. Gillett gave out her number but nobody called. Later, Lovich wrote him a letter providing more information about herself. This encouraged him to get her to record a demo of Tommy James and the Shondells' song "I Think We're Alone Now". He took the tape to Dave Robinson of Stiff Records, who liked it and decided to sign Lovich. He immediately proposed the song to be released as a single and wanted Lovich and Les Chappell to write and record a B-side.

In July 1978, Stiff released the first limited quantities of "I Think We're Alone Now" with an early version of "Lucky Number". Lovich and Chappell went on to record her first album Stateless, which was released in October of the same year. "Lucky Number" gained recognition and was later re-released as a lead single from the album.

Composition
The song is composed in D major at 120 beats per minute. The chorus consists of four dissonant notes sung in rapid succession. According to Lovich, she "didn't know anything about writing a song, so [the producer] just threw together a vocal line that sounded like a synthesizer." The chorus, coupled with a guitar ostinato and rapid vocal shouts from backup singers, gave the song and Lovich a sound that would define her next several records and, according to Rovi, "the hundreds of bands that followed."

Track listings and formats
7-inch single (UK)
"Lucky Number" – 2:47
"Home" – 3:45

12-inch single (UK)
"Lucky Number" – 2:47
"Home" – 3:45
"Lucky Number" (Version)

7-inch single (US)
"Lucky Number" (Slavic Dance Version) – 4:32
"Lucky Number" - 2:47

7-inch single (UK)
"Lucky Number"
"New Toy"

Charts

Weekly charts

Year-end charts

Certifications

References

External links
 

Songs about luck
1978 songs
1979 singles
Lene Lovich songs
Stiff Records singles